A list of earliest films produced in Azerbaijan SSR ordered by year of release in the 1930s:

Films: 1918–1990 see also List of Soviet films

1930

1931-

External links
 Azerbaijani film at the Internet Movie Database
 Azerbaycan Kinosu

Lists of 1930s films
1930s
Films